Bailiff Bridge railway station was built by the Lancashire and Yorkshire Railway to serve the village of Bailiff Bridge north of Brighouse in West Yorkshire, England.

History

Opened by the Lancashire and Yorkshire Railway, the station was then closed during the First World War as an economy measure. The route continued in use until mining subsidence caused the closure of the line in 1952.

References

External links
Bailiff Bridge station on navigable O.S. map
Railway Ramblers
Station location
Flickr

Disused railway stations in Calderdale
Former Lancashire and Yorkshire Railway stations
Railway stations in Great Britain opened in 1881
Railway stations in Great Britain closed in 1917
1881 establishments in England